The following highways are numbered 476:

Canada
Manitoba Provincial Road 476

Japan
 Japan National Route 476

United States
  Interstate 476
  Maryland Route 476
  Louisiana Highway 476
  Pennsylvania Route 476 (former)
  Puerto Rico Highway 476
  Tennessee State Route 476